The Ministry of Education (MOE) is a department of the Namibian government. It was established at Namibian independence in 1990, the first Namibian education minister was Nahas Angula. Between 1995 and 2005, and since 2015, its responsibility is only primary and secondary education, while vocational and university education fall under the Ministry of Higher Education, Training and Innovation. The  education minister is Anna Nghipondoka.

Additional portfolios
In 1990 the ministry was established as Ministry of Education, Culture, Youth and Sport. In 1991 the portfolios of youth and sport were split off, and a separate Ministry of Youth and Sport was created.

In 1995 the ministry was renamed Ministry of Basic Education and Culture. The responsibility for tertiary education was given to a new ministry, the Ministry of Higher Education and Vocational Education. This step was revoked in 2005, when the ministry was again renamed to Ministry of Education, and reinstated in 2015, when there again was a separate Ministry of Higher Education, and this ministry was named Ministry of Education, Arts and Culture.

Prime Ministers
All education ministers (excluding ministers of higher education) in chronological order are:

References

External links
Official website Ministry of Education, Arts and Culture

Education
Education
Education in Namibia
1990 establishments in Namibia